Kingsland is a town in Cleveland County, south central Arkansas, United States. It is included in the Pine Bluff, Arkansas Metropolitan Statistical Area, and had a population of 447 at the 2010 U.S. census. It is known as the birthplace of musician Johnny Cash. His parents had a cotton farm there.

History
Country singer Johnny Cash was born in Kingsland in 1932 during the Great Depression to parents who were poor cotton farmers. The family moved when he was three. Cash returned to the town in March 1994, for the dedication of the new post office named in his honor.

In May 2003, the 63-year-old main building at the Kingsland School was destroyed by fire. Damages were estimated to be over $2.1 million. The building's old pine, along with the varnish on the floors, oil on the wood inside, and a gas heating system all contributed to the fierce blaze. Later, the fire was found to have resulted from arson. Two suspects, including a firefighter, were subsequently arrested.

The film Come Morning (2011) featured Kingsland as its setting. Except for one scene filmed in New Edinburg, Arkansas, the rest of the film was shot entirely in Kingsland.

Education 
Public education for elementary and secondary school students is provided by the Cleveland County School District, which includes students attending Kingsland Elementary School prior to graduating from Rison High School. The district was established by the July 1, 2004 consolidation of the Rison School District and the Kingsland School District. Kingsland High School closed in 2004.

In 1890 a two-story building was adapted for Kingsland's first public school. A new school was built in 1940 during the Great Depression as part of the Works Progress Administration (WPA) projects initiated by the President Franklin D. Roosevelt administration.

Notable people

 Cory Carr, Israeli basketball player
 Johnny Cash, country singer-songwriter, actor and author

Geography
Kingsland is located at  (33.861397, -92.294200).

Demographics

As of the census of 2010, there were 447 people, 177 households, and 121 families residing in the town. The racial makeup of the town was 63.98% White, 32.89% Black or African American, 0.22% Native American, 0.45% Asian, and 2.46% from two or more races. None of the population was Hispanic or Latino of any race.

There were 219 households, out of which 29.9% had children under the age of 18 living with them, 49.7% were married couples living together, 13.0% had a female householder with no husband present, and 31.6% were non-families. 31.1% of all households were made up of individuals, and 13.0% had someone living alone who was 65 years of age or older. The average household size was 2.54 and the average family size was 3.20.

In the town, the population was spread out, with 27.96% under the age of 18, 5.82% from 20 to 24, 29.3% from 25 to 49, 20.81% from 50 to 64, and 13.2% who were 65 years of age or older. The median age was 32 years. There were 228 females and 219 males.

The median income for a household in the town was $20,536, and the median income for a family was $28,958. Males had a median income of $26,667 versus $16,250 for females. The per capita income for the town was $9,500. About 28.0% of families and 33.3% of the population were below the poverty line, including 42.9% of those under age 18 and 26.1% of those age 65 or over.

References

External links

Cities in Arkansas
Cities in Cleveland County, Arkansas
Cities in Pine Bluff metropolitan area